Shawky El Said, sometimes addressed by his nickname 'Kaboo', is an Egyptian football player. He has made his debut under Shawky Gharib on 5 March 2014 in a friendly game against Bosnia.

Honours

Club
Zamalek
Egypt Cup: 2016
Egyptian Super Cup: 2016

References

External links
 
 
 Shawky El Said at Footballdatabase

1987 births
Living people
Egyptian footballers
Egypt international footballers
Ismaily SC players
Zamalek SC players
Al-Arabi SC (Kuwait) players
Egyptian Premier League players
Association football defenders
El Shams SC players
El Gouna FC players
Al Ittihad Alexandria Club players
El Raja SC players
Egyptian expatriate footballers
Kuwait Premier League players
Egyptian expatriate sportspeople in Kuwait
Expatriate footballers in Kuwait